The Keelung Cultural Center is a cultural center in Zhongzheng District, Keelung, Taiwan.

History
The cultural center was inaugurated on 27 August 1985 as the Keelung City Cultural Center. On 1 December 2004, the cultural center was renamed as Keelung Cultural Center.

Architecture
The building is an 11-story multipurpose building which consists of museum, performance hall, library and other facilities. It also houses the Cultural Affairs Bureau office of the Keelung City Government.

Notable events
 42nd Golden Horse Awards

Transportation
The cultural center is accessible within walking distance east from Keelung Station of Taiwan Railways.

See also
 List of tourist attractions in Taiwan

References

1985 establishments in Taiwan
Buildings and structures completed in 1985
Cultural centers in Keelung